Zeke's Pad is a Canadian-Australian computer-animated television series co-produced by Bardel Entertainment, Flying Bark Productions, Star Farm Productions, and Leaping Lizard Productions in association with Seven Network and YTV. The show was produced with the participation of The Canadian Television Fund, The Province of British Columbia Film Incentive BC, The Canadian Film or Video Production Tax Credit, The Shaw Rocket Fund, The Independent Production Fund, Cogeco Program Development Fund, Bell Broadcast and New Media Fund, and British Columbia Film. It aired on YTV in Canada on Saturdays at 7 PM. The show is about the adventures of a 14-year-old skateboarder and artist named Zeke who owns a magic electronic pad that brings life to anything he draws on it.

Synopsis 
Zeke Palmer is an imaginative artist and skateboarder who lives with a weird and wacky family. His Pad is an amazing electronic gadget that is a mobile phone, PDA, GPS, MP3 player and a drawing tablet all rolled into one. Zeke's pad has a unique glitch: anything he draws comes to life. Being a creative artist that he is, Zeke is constantly drawing and making his drawings come to life, but he learns that for every action there is a reaction, and things don't turn out the way he imagines.

Characters 

 Ezekiel "Zeke" Palmer (voiced by Michael Adamthwaite): Zeke Palmer is a talented and creative 14-year-old artist and skateboarder. He is a risk taker and often acts without thinking of the consequences.
 Jayden "Jay" Fritter (voiced by Tim Hamaguchi): Jay is Zeke's best friend. Jay's computer knowledge and technical wizardry often help Zeke solve his problems. Jay is the only person who knows about the special power of Zeke's Pad.
 Rachel Palmer (voiced by Chiara Zanni): She is Zeke's twelve-year-old sister and a theater performer.
 Issac "Ike" Palmer (voiced by Trevor Devall): Zeke's 17-year-old brother and an athlete.
 Ida Palmer (voiced by Tabitha St. Germain): Zeke's mother who is very strict about organization and order in the house.
 Alvin Palmer (voiced by Trevor Devall): Zeke's father, a concert musician.
 Maxine Marx (voiced by Tabitha St. Germain): She is Zeke's secret crush, even though their personalities are almost complete opposites.

Episodes

Broadcast history 
Before its Canadian premiere on YTV, the show had been broadcast more than a dozen countries: Australia (Seven Network), Germany (ZDF), France on (Canal+ Family), Poland (ZigZap), India and Sri Lanka (Sun TV), Spain (Televiso de Catalunya), Latin America (Cartoon Network), and the Middle East (Spacetoon). Zeke's Pad was nominated for the Australian Film Institute Award for Best Children's Television Animation in 2010. At the 2010 Elan Awards, which honours achievements in video games, animation and visual effects, Zeke's Pad took home Best Animation TV Production and Best Art Direction awards.

References

External links
 
 Zeke's Pad @ Flying Bark Productions

Seven Network original programming
YTV (Canadian TV channel) original programming
2010s Canadian animated television series
2010 Canadian television series debuts
2010 Canadian television series endings
Australian children's animated action television series
Australian children's animated comedy television series
Australian computer-animated television series
2008 Australian television series debuts
2008 Australian television series endings
2000s Australian animated television series
Television series by Corus Entertainment
Canadian children's animated action television series
Canadian children's animated comedy television series
Canadian computer-animated television series
Teen animated television series
Television shows set in Vancouver
English-language television shows